Eugene Floyd DuBois (June 4, 1882 – February 12, 1959) was an American physician and teacher, remembered for his work on the physiology of fever and heat production. His grandmother Mary Ann Delafield DuBois founded a hospital in New York City in 1854.

He graduated in 1906 from the Columbia College of Physicians and Surgeons. He and Rebeckah Rutter were married in 1910. While also teaching at Cornell Medical College, he was medical director of the Russell Sage Institute of Pathology from 1911 until he retired.

During World War II, DuBois was a captain in the United States Naval Reserve, where he taught gas warfare training and defense, aviation medicine, and deep diving and submarine ventilation. Before the advent of nuclear powered submarines, DuBois spent 96 hours submerged, the record for the time.

DuBois mapped out basal metabolism for aging men, which he published in 1916. The Aub-DuBois table is still in use today.

He was most proud of the concept, worked out with David P. Barr, that the body can give off as much heat with a cool skin as with warm skin.

DuBois thought his "chief contribution was popularizing the simple, fundamental principles of metabolism in disease so that they eventually found their way into the textbooks and habits of thought."

Notes

1882 births
1959 deaths
American pathologists
Columbia University Vagelos College of Physicians and Surgeons alumni
Educators from New York (state)
Physicians from New York City
Weill Medical College of Cornell University faculty
Scientists from New York (state)
Members of the United States National Academy of Sciences
Delafield family